Pleonectoides is a genus of moths of the family Crambidae. It contains only one species, Pleonectoides vinacea, which is found in southern India.

References

Natural History Museum Lepidoptera genus database

Pyraustinae
Crambidae genera
Taxa named by George Hampson